Dadley is an English surname, a variant of Dudley. Notable people with the surname include:

 Jas Dadley (1898–1962), English footballer

See also

References 

English toponymic surnames